Otidea cochleata is a species of apothecial fungus belonging to the family Pyronemataceae. This is a rare European species occurring singly or in small groups on soil in woodland. The fruiting body appears from spring to late autumn as a brown, irregularly shaped cup, split down one side, up to 5 cm high and the same across.

References

Otidea cochleata at Species Fungorum

Pyronemataceae
Fungi described in 1753
Taxa named by Carl Linnaeus